Injimedu is a village in Vandavasi taluk, Tiruvannamalai District, state of Tamil Nadu, India.  census, it had a population of 1,663 in 406 households.

Landmarks 
 Injimedu Periyamalai Temple is dedicated to Lord Shiva.  
 An epigraph by Chola King Vikramadhitya located atop a hillock that dates back to 1126 A.D. and describes the story of Lord Shiva

Transport
Injimedu is located at 3 km from the town Peranamallur. The route to go Injimedu is
Kancheepuram - Cheyyaru - Pernamallur - Injimedu 
Tambaram - Uthiramerur - Vandavasi - Mazhaiyur (Chetpet Road) - Chinna kozhipuliyur - Injimedu.

Adjacent communities

References

External links
 http://www.devakottaidolphinramanathan.com/INJIMEDU%20NARASIMHAR/INJIMEDU%20NARASIMHAR%201.pdf
 http://www.devakottaidolphinramanathan.com/INJIMEDU%20NARASIMHAR/INJIMEDU%20NARASIMHAR%202.pdf
 http://www.devakottaidolphinramanathan.com/INJIMEDU%20NARASIMHAR/INJIMEDU%20NARASIMHAR%203.pdf
  Injimedu Perumal Temple picture gallery
 Thirumani Cherai Udayar
 From Dinamalar Temple Site
Shiva Temple

Villages in Tiruvannamalai district
Cities and towns in Tiruvannamalai district